Beijing City University (BCU) (Formerly known as Haidian University) is a comprehensive university founded in 1984 officially approved by Chinese Ministry of Education. BCU has achieved the sanction of granting degrees from Chinese Ministry of Education for graduate, undergraduate, specialties of higher vocational education qualifications and enrollment of foreign students.

Since then, the university has adhered to the Party’s and State’s educational policy and the guiding principle for the University. Guided by the market demand, BCU has made great achievements in exploring the reforms of running system and educational methodology of higher education.

History

Haidian University (1984-2003) 

In 1984, Fu Zhengtai (傅正泰) and others borrowed 50,000 RMB to found the Haidian University using the classroom of Beijing Chengfu Elementary School. The school was governed by the Haidian District, and supported by Tsinghua University, Peking University and Renmin University of China. Students had to pay their own tuition, and job placement was not assigned.

Beijing City University (2003-) 

In March 2003, the Chinese Ministry of Education approved the reformation of the school, which Beijing City University was founded upon it. The school was a private 4-year college, capable of granting bachelor and associate degree.

Timeline 
1984, the school Haidian University was founded.

March 2003, the school was reformed into Beijing City University, with capability of granting bachelor's degree.

April 2007, the school had achieved the sanction of granting bachelor's degree independently from the state.

February 2009, the school gained approval of admitting foreign students.

2009, the school CPC party branch was promoted under the leadership of city party branch from the district branch.

See also
List of universities in China
Education in Beijing

References

External links
  北京城市学院主页

Universities and colleges in Beijing